This is a list of suburbs in and around Darwin, Northern Territory, Australia, sorted by alphabetical order. All Darwin suburbs have postcodes beginning with 08.

Inner city municipalities and their suburbs

City of Darwin

Unincorporated area associated with the East Arm of Darwin Harbour
Berrimah 	(part)
Charles Darwin	(part)
Darwin Harbour
Darwin City (part)
East Arm
Elrundie
Hidden Valley (part)
Tivendale
Wishart

Outer municipalities and their suburbs

City of Palmerston

Shire of Litchfield

Wagait Shire Council
Before 2008-07-01 Cox Peninsula Community Government Council:
Wagait Beach (0822)
Mandorah (0822)

See also
Local government areas of the Northern Territory

References

Geography of the Northern Territory
Darwin
suburbs